The Franklin Lake Campground is located in Alvin, Wisconsin. It was added to the National Register of Historic Places in 1988.

History
The campground was put together by the Civilian Conservation Corps and the Works Progress Administration of the New Deal. It is located within the Chequamegon-Nicolet National Forest.

References

Parks on the National Register of Historic Places in Wisconsin
Campgrounds in the United States
Geography of Forest County, Wisconsin
Civilian Conservation Corps in Wisconsin
Works Progress Administration in Wisconsin
National Register of Historic Places in Forest County, Wisconsin
Temporary populated places on the National Register of Historic Places